Tala, sometimes also transliterated Talla (from ), is a city in the northern part of Monufia Governorate, Egypt.

The 1885 Census of Egypt recorded Tala as a city in its own district in Monufia Governorate; at that time, the population of the city was 9,653 (4,784 men and 4,869 women). The village of Kafr Zarqan accounts for over 1,500 of these residents, according to the 2006 census.

See also

 List of cities and towns in Egypt
 Kafr Zarqan

References

Populated places in Monufia Governorate
Cities in Egypt